Acrocercops sporograpta is a moth of the family Gracillariidae. It is known from India (Maharashtra).

The larvae feed on Litsea stocksii. They mine the leaves of their host plant.

References

sporograpta
Moths described in 1932
Moths of Asia